Allison is a surname of English and Scottish origin. It was a patronym, in most cases probably indicating son of Allen, but in other cases possibly from Ellis, Alexander, or the female given name Alice/Alise.

Alison, variant form Alizon, is a surname of French origin.

With the many variants of spelling through history, as well as the likelihood of phonetic spelling changes and variations through time; names such as Alison, Allason, Ellison, Allyson, Alasoune, Allinson and in some cases McAllister have been found to be interchangeable and variants of the different families using the same family name of 'Allison'.

Origins
The surname was first recorded in England in 1248, when a "William Alisun" is recorded in the Documents of the Abbey of Bee in Buckinghamshire.  In Scotland, the earliest record dates from 1296, when "Patrick Alissone, Count of Berwick" paid homage to the ruling council of Scotland in the absence of a proclaimed king.

List of people with the surname
Alison
Archibald Alison (author), Scottish priest and essayist
Sir Archibald Alison, 1st Baronet, historian
Sir Archibald Alison, 2nd Baronet, British Army officer
Charles Hugh Alison, British golf course architect
Charlie Alison, cricketer
Dorothy Alison, Australian actress
Ewen Alison, New Zealand politician
Francis Alison, minister in Synod of Philadelphia
Gilbert Alison, Australian politician
James Alison, Catholic priest, theologian and author
Jane Alison, Australian novelist
Joan Alison, writer
John R. Alison, American air force general
Michael Alison, British politician
Roberta Alison, American tennis player
William Alison, Scottish physician and philanthropist
Diezani Alison-Madueke (born 1960), Nigerian politician

Allison
Allison family, passengers on board the RMS Titanic
Abraham K. Allison (1810–1893), American businessman and politician
Aimee Allison (born 1969), American author, public affairs television host and political activist
Anne Allison, cultural anthropologist
Anthony Allison (soccer) (born 1987), Liberian-born American soccer player
Anthony Clifford Allison (1925–2014), South African medical scientist
Art Allison (1849–1916), American Major League Baseball player
Aundrae Allison (born 1984), American footballer
Ben Allison (born 1966), American jazz, rock bassist/composer
Bernard Allison (born 1965), American blues musician
Bill Allison (actor), American casino owner and actor
Bill Allison (baseball) (1850–1887), American professional baseball player
Bill Allison (footballer) (1908–1981), English footballer
Bob Allison (1934–1995), American baseball player
Bobby Allison (born 1937), American race car driver
Brett Allison (born 1968), Australian rules footballer
Brian Allison (born 1988), Scottish footballer
Brooke Allison (born 1986), American pop singer
C. FitzSimons Allison (born 1927), American Episcopal bishop and an author
Charles Gary Allison (1938–2008), American screenwriter and film producer
Chris Allison (born 1961), British record producer
Chris Allison (police officer), British senior officer of the Metropolitan Police Service
Clay Allison (1840–1887), American cattle rancher and gunfighter
Clifford Allison (1964–1992), American stock car racing driver
Dale Allison, American Christian theologian
Darren Allison (born 1968), English record producer, musician, and recording engineer
Davey Allison (1961–1993), American race car driver
David Allison (disambiguation)
Dean Allison (born 1965), Canadian politician
Donnie Allison (born 1939), American race car driver
Dorothy Allison (born 1949), American novelist
Dorothy Allison (psychic) (1924–1999), American self-proclaimed psychic detective
Dot Allison (born 1969), Scottish singer/songwriter
Doug Allison (1846–1916), American professional baseball player
Doug Allison (soccer) (born 1962), English footballer and coach
Elmer Allison (1883–1982), American radical activist and newspaper publisher
Emery Allison, American politician
Fran Allison (1907–1989), American television and radio personality
Fred Allison (1882–1974), American physicist
Gary Allison (born 1952), German-born American soccer player
Gene Allison (1934–2004), American R&B singer
George Allison (1883–1957), English football journalist, broadcaster and manager
Glenn Allison (born 1930), American professional ten-pin bowler
Graham T. Allison (born 1940), American political scientist
Hank Allison (born 1947), American professional football player
Henry Allison (1828–1881), Australian cricket player
Herbert M. Allison (1943–2013), American financial expert, former Assistant Secretary of the Treasury for Financial Stability
Humberto Guerra Allison (born 1940), Peruvian physician and scientist
Jacob Allison (born 1998), Australian rules footballer
James Allison Jr. (1772–1854), American lawyer and politician from Pennsylvania
James Allison (motorsport) (born 1968), British aerodynamicist, Technical Director of the Lotus Formula One team
James Allison (theatre) (1831–1890), theatre manager in Australia
James A. Allison (1872–1928), American businessman and industrialist
Jason Allison (born 1975), Canadian ice hockey player
Jay Allison, American radio producer and broadcast journalist
Jeff Allison (born 1984), American baseball pitcher
Jennifer Allison (born 1966), American author of mystery novels
Jeremy Allison (born 1962), computer programmer
Jerry Allison (1939–2022), American musician, drummer for The Crickets
Jim Allison (American football) (born 1943), American football player
Joe Allison (American football), American football player
John Allison (disambiguation)
Joseph Allison (disambiguation)
Kevin Allison (born 1970), American comedic writer and actor
Kyle Allison (born 1990), Scottish professional footballer
Lincoln Allison (born 1946), English writer
Luther Allison (1939–1997), American blues musician
Lyn Allison (born 1946), Australian senator
Mack Allison (1887–1964), American professional baseball player
Malcolm Allison (1927–2010), English football manager
Mary Bruins Allison (born 1903), American physician
Mary Emma Allison (1917–2010), American school librarian and UNICEF fundraiser
Matt Allison (racing driver) (born 1983), English racing driver
May Allison (1890–1989), American stage and film actress
May Allison (athlete) (born 1964), Canadian long-distance runner
Mike Allison (born 1961), Canadian ice hockey player
Monica Allison, American actress and voice actor
Mose Allison (1927–2016), American jazz pianist and singer
Odis Allison (born 1949), American basketball player
Oliver Allison (1908–1989), English Anglican missionary bishop
Olivia Allison (born 1990), British synchronized swimmer
Peter Allison, Australian writer and African safari guide
Ray Allison (born 1959), Canadian professional ice hockey player
Rebecca Allison (born 1946), American cardiologist
Richard Allison (disambiguation)
Robert Allison (disambiguation)
Rodney Allison (born 1956), American college football coach
Samuel King Allison (1900–1965), American physicist
Scott Allison (born 1972), Canadian ice hockey player
Stacy Allison, American mountaineer, the first American woman to climb Mount Everest
Stephen Allison (born 1971), American politician
Stub Allison (1892–1961), American football, basketball, and baseball coach
Susan Allison, American editor-in-chief and vice president at Ace Books
Susan Louisa Moir Allison (1845–1937), Canadian author and pioneer
Tom Allison (Australian footballer) (born 1944), Australian rules footballer
Tomilea Allison (born 1934), American politician
Vera Allison (1902–1993), American Modernist jeweler, painter
Wade Allison (disambiguation)
Wayne Allison (born 1968), English footballer and coach
Wick Allison (1948–2020), American magazine publisher and author
Will Allison (born 1968), American author
William B. Allison (1829–1908), American politician
William D. Allison (1861–1923), American lawman
William Henry Allison (1838–1934), Canadian politician
Wilmer Allison (1904–1977), American amateur tennis champion
Young E. Allison (1853–1932), American writer and newspaper editorials 
Allyson
June Allyson, American film and television actress

See also
Alison (name)
Alison baronets
Allison (disambiguation)
Allyson
Alyson
Ellison

References

English-language surnames